Iranian FY2022 National budget had increased tax, boost for space budget, budget was increased for Sepah Pasdaran as well.

Oil was set to be predicted 60$ per barrel in the budget.

increase
National information network

References 

Economy of Iran
2022 government budgets